Uri Benjamin (born 11 March 1954) is an Israeli former professional footballer that has played in Hapoel Be'er Sheva

Honours

Club
 Hapoel Be'er Sheva

 Premier League:
 Winners (2): 1974/1975, 1975/1976
 Super Cup:
 Winners (1): 1974/1975
 Runners-up (1): 1975/1976

References

1954 births
Living people
Hapoel Be'er Sheva F.C. players
Footballers from Beersheba
Liga Leumit players
Israeli people of Indian-Jewish descent
Israeli footballers
Association football fullbacks
Israeli Footballer of the Year recipients